Kung Fu Chefs is a 2009 Hong Kong action film directed by Ken Yip, starring Sammo Hung, Louis Fan, Vanness Wu, Sammo Hung's real life son Timmy Hung, Ku Feng and Lee Hoi-sang. This was Lee Hoi-Sang's final film appearance. This film was shot with a low budget.

Plot
Wong Kai Joe (Louis Fan) has had hatred of his uncle Wong Ping Yee (Sammo Hung) in his heart for a very long time and does what he can to oust his uncle from the village and to claim rights to the Dragon Head Cleaver, a symbol of power to the clan. During a function, he used Yee's nephew to put poison in the form of salt. The guest become sick and Wong Ping Yee is forced out of the village. The story then shifts to Ken'chi who is the first to graduate from his school after being the first amongst his batch to place the emblem in the flag. He is advised by his principal to go and meet Master Sum who, he feels, will be able to teach him cooking. Meanwhile, Yee encounters Shum Ching (Cherrie Ying) and her sister (Ai Kago) by chance, and is determined to help them during troubled times at their restaurant "Four Seas". He trains a young chef, Ken'ichi Lung Kin Yat (Vanness Wu) to compete against Chef Tin (Lam Chi-chung), the head chef at "Imperial Palace", for the title of "Top Chef". After the tournament, he meets his brother who is alive and to the angst of Joe who watches helplessly on TV.

Cast

See also
Osaka Wrestling Restaurant
Sammo Hung filmography

External links
 
 Kung Fu Chefs at the Hong Kong Movie Database
 
 Hong Kong Cinemagic - Kung Fu Chefs

2009 films
2009 action films
2000s Cantonese-language films
Cooking films
Hong Kong action films
Hong Kong cuisine
Kung fu films
2000s Mandarin-language films
Hong Kong martial arts films
2000s Hong Kong films